Brigadier General Sir Walter Ramsay McNicoll,  (27 May 1877 – 24 December 1947) was an Australian teacher, soldier, and colonial administrator.

Early life
McNicoll was born in the Melbourne suburb of Emerald Hill, on 27 May 1877. He was the only son and eldest of three children to William Walter Alexander McNicoll (1852–1937) and Ellen McNicoll (née Ramsay, 1852–1900). He trained as a teacher in the Victorian Education Department and at Melbourne University. He held posts in various country schools in Victoria, then as senior master at Melbourne High School and, from 1911 to 1914, founding principal of Geelong High School. At the same time he had been active in the Victorian militia, which at the outbreak of the First World War became part of the Australian Imperial Force (AIF).

First World War
As a lieutenant colonel, McNicoll commanded the 6th Battalion, 2nd Australian Brigade, at Gallipoli and was seriously wounded during an infantry charge in the Second Battle of Krithia on 8 May 1915. The brigade suffered 36 percent casualties in the course of two hours of action. He was found on the battlefield that evening by Charles Bean, then a war correspondent—later, Australia's official war historian. Bean piled discarded packs around McNicoll as protection against the still-continuing small arms fire and returned in the night with a stretcher party. McNicoll was invalided to Alexandria and then to London, where a second operation finally located and removed the bullet from his abdomen.

Following a year's recuperation in Melbourne, McNicoll was promoted to brigadier general and given command of the 10th Infantry Brigade of the 3rd Division—under the command of Major General John Monash and, later, John Gellibrand. From December 1916 to the armistice nearly two years later, the brigade was part of numerous actions on the Western Front, including Messines, Ypres, the Somme, and Amiens.

Later life
After the war McNicoll returned to teaching as founding principal of what is now the Argyl School in Goulburn, in southern New South Wales. In 1931, he stood for and won the federal seat of Werriwa, which extended from Goulburn to the coast, running as a member of the Country Party. He resigned towards the end of his term, however, when he was appointed Administrator of the Mandated Territory of New Guinea.

He served in that position from 1934 up to the time of the Japanese invasion in 1942. (During that period, the northern part of what is now Papua New Guinea, including New Britain and Bougainville, was administered by Australia under a League of Nations mandate; the southern part, Papua, was an Australian colony.) The manifold responsibilities of Administrator ranged from education and justice to defence, with often conflicting advice or direction coming from the Permanent Mandates Commission and the Australian government, and pressures from the various religious missions, as well as commercial mining and plantation interests—the latter being almost the sole source of the Territory's revenues. Keenly interested in exploration, he led an expedition to the upper Sepik in 1935 (the party included the young J.K. McCarthy) and subsequently sponsored the Hagen-Sepik Patrol (1938–39) which explored the last great unknown tract of the Territory. McNicoll was knighted for his work organising relief efforts after the 1937 volcanic eruption that nearly destroyed the Territory capital, Rabaul.

He married Hildur Marschalk Wedel Jarlsberg, from a distinguished Norwegian family, on 10 June 1905. Their marriage produced five children, all sons: Ronald Ramsay McNicoll (1906–1996); Sir Alan Wedel Ramsay McNicoll (1908–1987); Colin Wedel Ramsay McNicoll (1909–1921); Frederick Oscar Ramsay McNicoll (1910–1989); and David Ramsay (aka Jack Meander) McNicoll (1914–2000). Ronald and Alan both attained senior positions in the Australian military—becoming a major general and vice admiral respectively—while David was a well known Sydney-based journalist.

McNicoll died in Sydney on 24 December 1947, aged 70 years.

Notes

References
Les Carlyon, Gallipoli. Melbourne: Pan Macmillan, 2001.
J. K. McCarthy, Patrol Into Yesterday. Melbourne, 1963.
Ronald McNicoll, Walter Ramsay McNicoll 1877–1947. Melbourne, privately printed, 1973. (Copy in the National Library of Australia, Canberra.)
R. R. McNicoll, "Sir Walter McNicoll as Administrator of the Mandated Territory," Journal of the Papua & New Guinea Society, vol. 2, no. 2 (1969), pp. 5–16.
Sir John Monash, The Australian Victories in France in 1918. Sydney, 1936.

1877 births
1947 deaths
Military personnel from Melbourne
Australian military personnel of World War I
20th-century Australian politicians
Administrators of the Territory of New Guinea
Australian Companions of the Distinguished Service Order
Australian Companions of the Order of St Michael and St George
Australian Companions of the Order of the Bath
Australian educators
Australian generals
Australian Knights Commander of the Order of the British Empire
Australian public servants
Members of the Australian House of Representatives for Werriwa
National Party of Australia members of the Parliament of Australia
People from South Melbourne